SONIA (Sterling Over Night Index Average) is the effective reference for overnight indexed swaps for unsecured transactions in the Sterling market. SONIA is a risk-free rate.

History
SONIA was launched in March 1997 by WMBA Limited, and is endorsed by the British Bankers Association (BBA).

The Bank of England took on administration of rate in April 2016. Two years later, in April 2018, the rate underwent a number of reforms. In the same year efforts to promote SONIA as the standard Sterling interest rate benchmark for loans, derivatives and bonds were stepped up.

In July 2019, UK transport group National Express obtained the first corporate loan referencing SONIA. The loan was drawn from NatWest as part of a pilot scheme before launch into the wider market.

In February 2021 the Working Group on Sterling Risk-Free Reference Rates (RFRWG) announced the end of the GBP Libor by the end of 2021 and recommended to cease initiation of GBP LIBOR-linked loans, bonds, securitisations and linear derivatives by end of March 2021.

Technical details
On each London business day, SONIA is measured as the trimmed mean, rounded to four decimal places, of interest rates paid on eligible sterling denominated deposit transactions. The trimmed mean is calculated as the volume-weighted mean rate, based on the central 50% of the volume-weighted distribution of rates.

Eligible transactions are:

 reported to the Bank’s Sterling Money Market daily data collection, in accordance with the effective version of the ‘Reporting Instructions for Form SMMD’;
 unsecured and of one business day maturity;
 executed between 00:00 hours and 18:00 hours UK time and settled that same-day; and
 greater than or equal to £25 million in value.

The rate conventions are: annualised rate, act/365, four decimal places.

In 2018, SONIA (floating rate) bonds accounted for 20.7 per cent share of UK issuance compared to 48.1 per cent share of Interbank Offered Rate (floating rate) bonds.

See also
Federal funds rate
London Inter-bank Offered Rate
Mutan rate
List of acronyms: European sovereign-debt crisis

References

External links
 
 WMBA - Wholesale Markets Brokers' Association
 BBA Guide to SONIA

Banking in the United Kingdom
Interest rates
Reference rates